Melankomas, or Melancomas, meaning 'One with the Black Hair,' was an Ancient Greek boxer from Caria and victor in the 207th Olympiad (49 AD.).

Biography 
Melankomas was born in Caria to an Ancient Greek boxing champion, of the same name, who lived during the first century C.E. He made a name for himself as an Ancient Greek boxer in the Olympiad, even winning in the 207th Olympiad in 49 A.D. 

Supposedly he had a unique boxing style, blocking and avoiding the punches of the other boxer without throwing any himself. Once his opponents had run out of stamina they would forfeit, leaving Melankomas the victor. It was related by Dio Chrysostom that he was able to fight like this by training significantly more than his contemporaries and having an unmatched endurance, being able to fight through a whole day or hold his arms up, in a static hold, continuously for two days.

Melankomas died young, around the year 70 A.D. during the games in Naples.

Legacy 
Melankomas is known to us mainly from the 28th and 29th Discourses of Dio Chrysostom, in which that writer uses his life as a canvas for a discussion of the ideal athlete and the ideal man; Dio praises his athleticism, good looks, and brave heart. Dio says he never lost a match, hit an opponent, or was struck by an opponent. Themistius reports that the emperor Titus was his lover.

Some scholars believe Melankomas to have been a real person, while others believe that he or his record was an invention of Dio's; there is nothing allowing a firm conclusion either way.

Melankomas was mentioned in a second-season episode of Sports Night as a contender for "Athlete of the Millennium."

References

External links
Dio Chrysostom, Discourses 28–29

Ancient Greeks in Caria
Roman-era Greeks
Roman-era Olympic competitors
Ancient Greek boxers
1st-century births
Place of birth unknowncaria

Year of birth unknown
Year of death unknown
Greek male boxers